is a Japanese author. In 2005, Hasekura won the Silver Prize in the twelfth Dengeki Novel Prize with his debut novel Spice and Wolf. The first volume was published the following year.

Early life
Hasekura studied at Rikkyo University.

Works

Spice and Wolf series

A light novel series of 22 volumes written by Isuna Hasekura, it is his most influential work to date and has spawned many adaptations and spinoffs including anime, manga, and video games. In 2016 a sequel series titled of light novels began publication under the title Wolf and Parchment.

Billionaire Girl series
A manga about a lonely girl who is a successful day trader  and an average college student who is hired by her for the purpose of tutoring her, but not only. The manga is completed with 3 volumes.

World End Economica series
A three-part visual novel series, developed by Spicy Tails, the scenario of which is written by Isuna Hasekura. The plot sets in the far future on the moon, 16 years after humans have begun to colonize it. It begins on a young man's impossible dream of standing where no man had stood. And to do that he needs large amount of capital that can only be obtain through risky means via the stock markets.

All three episodes have been localised in English and made available through Steam. A successful Kickstarter campaign ensured that the series would be made available in English along with a HD graphic upgrade.

Magudala de Nemure series

Project LUX
A VR game developed by Spicy Tails, with Isuna Hasekura listed under "Project/Scenario".

References

External links
Isuna Hasekura's blog 

1982 births
21st-century Japanese novelists
Light novelists
Living people
Writers from Chiba Prefecture
Rikkyo University alumni